Um Anjo Caiu do Céu is a Brazilian telenovela produced and broadcast by TV Globo. It premiered on 22 January 2001, replacing Uga-Uga, and ended on 25 August 2001, replaced by As Filhas da Mãe. The telenovela is written by Antônio Calmon, with the collaboration of Eliane Garcia, Lílian Garcia, Márcia Prates, Maria Helena Nascimento, and Álvaro Ramos.

It stars Tarcísio Meira, Caio Blat, Renata Sorrah, Christiane Torloni, José Wilker, Patricia Pillar, Marcello Antony, and Débora Falabella.

Cast 
 Tarcísio Meira as João Medeiros
 Caio Blat as Rafael
 Renata Sorrah as Naná
 Christiane Torloni as Laila de Montaltino
 José Wilker as Tarso
 Débora Falabella as Cuca
 Henri Castelli as Breno
 Patrícia Pillar as Duda
 Deborah Evelyn as Virgínia
 Marcello Antony as Maurício
 Caco Ciocler as David
 Cássio Gabus Mendes as Paulinho / Paulão
 Angélica as Angelina
 Chris Couto as Eva Lenya
 Supla as Alex de Leon
 Débora Lamm as Alice Maciel
 Susana Werner as Deborah
 Felipe Camargo as Josué
 Sthefany Brito as Dorinha"
 Jonatas Faro as Joaquim "Kiko"
 Antônio Petrin as Carlos dos Anjos "Carlão"
 Ana Rosa as Laurinda dos Anjos
 Paulo José as Alceu
 Miriam Pires as Ermelinda
 Caio Junqueira as Adolfinho
 Mariana Hein as Carolina "Carol" Pascoal
 Janaína Lince as Joana Soares "Jô"
 Karine Carvalho as Michelle
 Rodrigo Eldestein as André "Dé"
 Rosane Gofman as Expedita
 Luís Salem as Ávila Brunner
 Gustavo Mello as Fernando "Nando"
 Zé Carlos Machado as Emanuel Steinberg
 Bel Kutner as Luciana "Lulu"
 João Camargo as Gildo
 Maria Gladys as Zezé
 Larissa Queiroz as Luana
 Thiago Oliveira as Felipe "Lipe" Medeiros
 Michel Capeletti as Robson dos Anjos
 João Paulo Biancardini as Gustavo "Guga" Medeiros

Guest stars 
 Daniel Dantas as Selmo de Windsor / Zeca de Santa Teresa / Telmo Martins
 Jan Ponan as Eric Brunner
 Tarcísio Filho as Rodrigo Medeiros Ferreira
 Hugo Carvana as Sargento Garcia
 Luma Costa as Young Ermelinda
 Luciano Szafir as Eduardo
 Guilherme Weber as Carl
 Odilon Wagner as Sid Valente / Coyote
 Sérgio Loroza as Jacaré
 Fabiana Oliveira as Alexandra
 Matheus Rocha as Tomás
 Breno Moroni as Pingue
 Eduardo Andrade as Pongue
 Alexandre Zacchia as Peçanha
 Sílvia Bandeira as Giovana
 Dennis Carvalho as Jaime

References

External links 
 

2001 Brazilian television series debuts
2001 Brazilian television series endings
2001 telenovelas
2000s Brazilian television series
TV Globo telenovelas
Brazilian telenovelas
Portuguese-language telenovelas
Angels in television
Child abduction in television